Keshab Mahanta (6 July 1959) is an Indian politician. He was elected to the Lok Sabha, lower house of the Parliament of India from the Kaliabor Constituency of Assam in 1996 as a member of the Asom Gana Parishad. He was elected to the Assam Legislative Assembly from Kaliabor in 2006.

Currently he is the Cabinet Minister for Health and Family Welfare, Science and Technology and Information Technology in the Government of Assam. He assumed charge on 12 May 2021.

References

External links
Official biographical sketch in Parliament of India website

India MPs 1996–1997
1959 births
Living people
Lok Sabha members from Assam
Members of the Assam Legislative Assembly
Asom Gana Parishad politicians
State cabinet ministers of Assam
Assam MLAs 2016–2021
Assam MLAs 2021–2026